The Women's 4 x 6 kilometre biathlon relay competition at the 2006 Winter Olympics in Turin, Italy was held on 23 February, at Cesana San Sicario. Each national team consisted of four members, with each skiing 6 kilometres and shooting twice, once prone and once standing.

Summary
At each shooting station, a competitor has eight shots to hit five targets; however, only five bullets are loaded in a magazine at one - if additional shots are required, the spare bullets must be loaded one at a time. If after the eight shots are taken, there are still targets not yet hit, the competitor must ski a 150-metre penalty loop.

Germany won the relay event at the 2002 Winter Olympics, while Russia's women were the defending World Champions after beating Germany by 41.4 seconds at the 2005 World Championship; Russia also led the World Cup standings after four relay events.

Despite missing the veteran Olga Pyleva, suspended for two years after failing an anti-doping test the previous week, the Russian team led from start to finish. The Germans finished 50.7 seconds behind for the silver. The French team took the bronze.

Results 
The race was held at 12:00.

References

Women's biathlon at the 2006 Winter Olympics